= Koulouba =

Koulouba may refer to the following places:

- Koulouba, Bamako, Mali
- Koulouba, Ouagadougou, Burkina Faso
